Chrysilla guineensis is a  species of jumping spider. It is endemic to Guinea. It was described in 2013 based on specimens collected from the Nimba Mountains.

Description
Chrysilla guineensis is a medium-sized spider with elongated body. In the male, the prosoma (cephalothorax) measures  and the opisthosoma (abdomen) measures . The carapace is oval, slightly flattened, and brown. The abdomen is elongated, narrower than carapace, and greyish brown with some yellowish patches. The first pair is light brown and longer and thicker than the other pairs, which are yellow. The carapace is oval, light brown, and less hairy than in the male. The abdomen is ovoid and tapering (not elongated), and yellowish grey with darker spots, turning brownish posteriorly, or sometimes, brownish grey with traces of lighter spots. The legs are light yellow.

Chrysilla guineensis  is best distinguished from the other closely related species by the structure of genitalia.

References

Salticidae
Spiders of Africa
Arthropods of Guinea
Endemic fauna of Guinea
Spiders described in 2013
Taxa named by Wanda Wesołowska